Andrey Alexandrovich Klishas (born November 9, 1972) is a Russian politician and lawyer serving as the Senator from Krasnoyarsk Krai since 2012. Member of the United Russia political party.

Andrey Klishas is the plenipotentiary of the Federation Council in the Constitutional Court of Russia and the General Prosecutor's pffice, judge of the World Canine Organization, and head of the department of theory of state and law of the Law Institute of RUDN University.

Biography
Andrey Klishas born on 9 November 1972 in Sverdlovsk. Father - Alexander Gennadyevich Klishas, military, retired colonel. Mother - Vera Vasilievna, worked as a chemical engineer.

Since 1990, he studied at the Ural State University (specializing in “History of Philosophy”), but did not graduate from it. He moved to Moscow, where he entered the Faculty of Economics and Law of the Peoples' Friendship University of Russia (RUDN University). In 1998, he received a bachelor's degree in law from the RUDN University, and in 2000 graduated from the university magistracy with a master's degree in law. In 2002 he graduated from the graduate school of the department of constitutional, administrative and financial law of the RUDN University.

In 1998, he joined the Board of Directors of Norilsk Nickel. From 2001 to 2008, he was Chairman of the Board of Directors of MMC Norilsk Nickel. Since October 2001, he has been General Director; since December 2001, he has been Chairman of the Management Board of Interros. He held the post until 2008. From 2010 to 2012 he was the President of Norilsk Nickel.

In December 2011, he ran for the State Duma by United Russia party list, but he didn't win a seat in the State Duma.

In March 2012, Klishas was elected to the Norilsk City Council of Deputies from United Russia party. On 19 March 2012, he was appointed Senator from Krasnoyarsk Krai by Governor Lev Kuznetsov.

On 30 May 2012, he became the Chairman of the Federation Council Committee on constitutional law, legal and judicial issues and the development of civil society (in 2014 renamed the Committee on constitutional legislation and state construction).

In 2016, he became Head of the Department of Theory of State and Law of the Law Institute of RUDN University.

In February 2022, around the start of the  Russian invasion of Ukraine, he said that "Now time has come to put a padlock on the embassies, and continue contact through binoculars and gunsights".

References

1972 births
21st-century Russian politicians
21st-century Russian lawyers
Peoples' Friendship University of Russia alumni
Ural State University alumni
United Russia politicians
Members of the Federation Council of Russia (after 2000)
Russian individuals subject to European Union sanctions
Living people
Russian people of Lithuanian descent